The Clive Churchill Medal is the award given to the player judged to be man-of-the-match in the National Rugby League's annual Grand Final. The award was created to honour Clive Churchill, one of the greatest rugby league players in Australian history, following his death in 1985. A prestigious honour in the NRL, the medal's recipient is chosen by the selectors of the Australian national team and announced and awarded at the post-grand final ceremony.

The Clive Churchill Medal has been awarded ever since the 1986 NSWRL season when its first recipient was Parramatta's Peter Sterling. It was initially presented in a case until 2000 where it is presented separately with a ribbon being worn around the neck. The only two players to have won the award more than once are Canberra's Bradley Clyde (1989 and 1991) and Melbourne Storm's Billy Slater (2009 and 2017). In 2010, the Melbourne Storm were stripped of the 2007 and 2009 premierships due to salary cap breaches exposed by the NRL, however the Clive Churchill Medallists from those years still continue to be recognised.

The medal has only been awarded to a member of the losing grand final team on four occasions. Bradley Clyde in 1991, Brad Mackay (St George) in 1993, Daly Cherry-Evans (Manly) in 2013, and Jack Wighton (Canberra Raiders) in 2019.

Churchill, who the medal was named after, played for and later coached the South Sydney Rabbitohs, played interstate football for both New South Wales and Queensland, and also played for, captained and coached the Australian Kangaroos.

List of recipients

Retrospective awards
As part of the Centenary of League celebrations, the Clive Churchill Medal has been retrospectively awarded for man-of-the-match performances from season 1954, the first to feature mandatory grand finals. The first recipient from the 1954 season is the man for which the award was originally named, Clive Churchill.

Despite claims to the contrary at the time of the announcement of the retrospective medals that there had not been Man Of The Match awards for Grand Finals prior to 1986, this was not the case - there had been the Dave Brown Medal awarded at some stage, and, according to the NSWRL's official match day program, a new prize was awarded in 1971, with the winner named by reporters covering the game ( (the first was won by South Sydney's Ron Coote). In 1972 the award went to Manly half back Dennis Ward, and the following year, to Manly's Bob Fulton. In 1974, Arthur Beetson won the press writers award, and in 1975 it was Ian Schubert. The retrospective Clive Churchill Medals - either by coincidence or design - reflect those award winners.

In the replayed grand finals of 1977 and 1978, the award was based on efforts over the course of both games, although Manly-Warringah's Graham Eadie was a clear choice in 1978 after a dominating performance from fullback in the Grand Final replay.

Multiple winners
The following players have won the Clive Churchill Medal multiple times.

* Retrospective medals.

See also

Dally M Medal
Harry Sunderland Trophy
Norm Smith Medal
Karyn Murphy Medal

References

External links

NRL Grand Finals
Rugby league trophies and awards
National Rugby League
Rugby league in Sydney
Australian sports trophies and awards